Henry Thrale (1724/1730?–4 April 1781) was a British politician who sat in the House of Commons from 1765 to 1780. He was a close friend of Samuel Johnson. Like his father, he was the proprietor of the large London brewery H. Thrale & Co.

Born at the Alehouse in Harrow Corner, Southwark, he was the son of the rich brewer Ralph Thrale (1698–1758) and Mary Thrale. He married Hester Lynch Salusbury on 11 October 1763; they had 12 children, and she outlived him. He was MP for Southwark 23 December 1765 – September 1780, an Alderman, and Sheriff of the City of London: a respected, religious man who was a good hunter and sportsman with a taste for gambling.

Education
Thrale was educated at Eton College and University College, Oxford, where he matriculated on 4 June 1744. He travelled in Europe with Lord William Henry Lyttleton Westcote (1724–1808).

Friendship with Samuel Johnson
Johnson first met the Thrales on the 9 or 10 January 1765, and immediately became almost a part of their family. There was much good literary company. When Fanny Burney was admitted to the circle, Samuel Crisp wrote "Where will you find such another set? Oh, Fanny, set this down as the happiest period of your life." Johnson mostly lived with the Thrales at his country house Streatham Park or brewery home for the next 15 years until Henry's death in 1781.

Parliamentary and business career
On 23 December 1765, Henry Thrale was elected to Parliament. He continued to represent Southwark until his election defeat in 1780.

Thrale inherited the Anchor Brewery, Southwark from his father. In 1772 a scheme for brewing beer without malt or hops put the brewery in debt by £130,000 (£13 million today). This almost bankrupted Henry Thrale. Hester Thrale raised money from her mother and other friends and he cleared the debt in nine years.

Travels
In 1774 Samuel Johnson went with the Thrales on a tour of Wales, during which time they visited Hester's cousin, Sir Robert Cotton at Lleweni Hall in Denbighshire.

In September 1775 Hester, Henry and their eldest child Queeney, together with Samuel Johnson and Giuseppe Baretti, went to Paris.

On 19 October 1775 the party was admitted to the Court of King Louis XVI and Queen Marie Antoinette at Fontainebleau, and enjoyed dinner and an evening at the theatre with them.

Family life
Henry and Hester Thrale had twelve children of whom only four daughters survived to adulthood:

Hester Maria (Queeney) (17 September 1764 – 31 March 1857)
Frances (27 September 1765 – 6 October 1765)
Henry Salusbury (15 February 1766 – 23 March 1776)
Anna Maria (1 April 1768 – 21 March 1770)
Elizabeth (22 June 1769 – 22 November 1773)
Susannah Arabella (23 May 1770 – 5 November 1858)
Sophia (23 July 1771 – 8 November 1824)
Penelope (15 September 1772 – 15 September 1772)
Ralph (8 November 1773 – 13 July 1775)
Frances Anna (4 May 1775 – 9 December 1775)
Cecelia Margaretta (8 February 1777 – 1 May 1857)
Hester Sophia (21 June 1778 – 25 April 1783)

Henry and Hester's marriage has misleadingly been described as loveless. While there was no great passion, they loved and respected each other. On their wedding anniversary in 1787 Hester wrote:

The speculation that Hester did not love her husband may have originated from the fact that she was of significantly higher social status than Thrale, and often eclipsed him at social events due to her family's pedigree. This, according to all reports, infuriated Thrale at certain times and may have led to an awkward relationship between the two during the public events. Fanny Burney records that Hester's mind was 'cruelly disordered' with grief at Henry's death.

Personality
In June 1777 his wife wrote in Thraliana ...

Illness and death
On 1 April 1777 Henry's death was falsely reported in the newspapers, and threw James Boswell into "a state of very uneasy uncertainty".

On 8 or 11 June 1779, Thrale went to the house of his sister – Mrs Susannah Nesbitt – to read the will of her husband Arnold Nesbitt, MP for Cricklade. During the meal, Henry had his first stroke. Read more >> The second stroke came on 19 or 21 February 1780; on 10 September he had a third, while canvassing constituents during the 1780 general election campaign.

The strokes were largely caused by Henry's voracious appetite for large indulgent meals, accompanied by large quantities of ale.

Henry Thrale died in London at 5 a.m. 4 April 1781, with his wife and Johnson by his side. He was buried in the crypt of St. Leonards Church, Streatham. Henry's epitaph was written by Samuel Johnson.

Obituaries

He also wrote of Thrale:

In his Life of Johnson, James Boswell mentions Henry's worthy principles, sound scholarship, business acumen, general intelligence and polished manners. He also added his impressive looks, dignified bearing and generosity towards his wife in his allowance to her for entertaining those guests of her own choosing.

Will
The executors of Henry Thrale's will were Samuel Johnson, Henry Smith, Joseph Crutchley, John Cator and Hester Thrale. The Anchor Brewhouse was quickly sold to David Barclay, who took Thrale's old manager, John Perkins (1730–1812), into partnership. They became Barclay, Perkins and Company. The sale figure was £135,000 (£13,500,000 or $22,500,000 today).

This was all left in trust for Thrale's five daughters who are said to have been left £20,000 each (£2,000,000 today). From other assets his wife was left the interest from £50,000 for life and the contents of Streatham Park (including all Sir Joshua Reynolds paintings) for life.

Samuel Johnson famously said, "We are not here to sell a parcel of boilers and vats, but the potentiality of growing rich beyond the dreams of avarice."

References

External links

Henry Thrale's homes
Henry Thrale's parliamentary career
Anchor Brewery
Henry Thrale's death & funeral
Henry Thrale's will
Henry Thrale at the National Portrait Gallery, London

1724 births
1781 deaths
Members of the Parliament of Great Britain for English constituencies
People educated at Eton College
Alumni of University College, Oxford
English brewers
Councilmen and Aldermen of the City of London
Brewing in London
Samuel Johnson
Streathamites
Sheriffs of the City of London
People from Southwark
British MPs 1761–1768
British MPs 1768–1774
British MPs 1774–1780
18th-century English businesspeople